"Sunlight" is a song by Belgian DJ and record producer The Magician which features guest vocals from Olly Alexander of the English synth-pop band Years & Years. The song was released in the United Kingdom as a digital download on 28 September 2014. The song was written by Stephen Fasano, Olly Alexander, and Mark Ralph. The song was used in the 2015 film We Are Your Friends.

Live performances
The Magician and Years & Years performed the song at the 2014 MTV Europe Music Awards in Glasgow, Scotland, U.K. as part of the Digital Show. It was performed live during Years & Years' 2022 Night Call Tour.

Charts

Weekly charts

Year-end charts

Certifications

Release history

References

2014 singles
2014 songs
Years & Years songs
FFRR Records singles
Electronic dance music songs
Songs written by Mark Ralph (record producer)
Songs written by Olly Alexander
Song recordings produced by Mark Ralph (record producer)